Empatic is a Polish death metal band based in Ostrołęka. Since forming in December 2005, they have released one full-length album.

The band was formed in 2005 by vocalist Maciej Rochaczewski and bassist Włodzimierz "Włodas" Małaszek.  The first line-up consisted of Jakub Bednarski (guitar) and Piotr "Kinal" Kinalski (drums). In 2007, the band released their first demo entitled Promo, which consisted of five original compositions and Orchestral Manoeuvres in the Dark cover "Enola Gay". Later that year, Empatic played their first gig outside their hometown with Hate, Crionics and others during the Panzerfest II festival in Warsaw.

Their first full-length album, Gods of Thousand Souls, was released in 2010 by WM Psycho, exclusively in Poland. 2012 saw the release across world, by Terrasound Records.

Band members 
Current members
 Maciej Rochaczewski – vocals (2005)
 Włodzimierz "Włodas" Małaszek – bass (2005-)
 Krzysztof "Criss" Bendarowicz – drums (2008-2009, 2012-)
 Jakub Bednarski – guitar (2005-2012, since 2013)
 Radosław Chrzanowski – guitar (2017-)
Former members
 Przemysław "Sesyl" Cikacz – guitar (2006-2017)
 Piotr "Kain" Kołakowski – guitar (2012-2013)
 Piotr "Kinal" Kinalski – drums (2005-2007)
 Jarosław "YopeQue" Śliwka – drums (2009-2012)

Discography 
Studio albums
 Gods of Thousand Souls (2010, Psycho Rec.(PL) / 2012, Terrasound Rec. (EU))
 Ruined Landscape (2014, Terrasound Records)

Singles
 Niewinny (2017)

Demos
 Promo (2007)

References

External links

 Empatic at YouTube

Polish death metal musical groups
Polish thrash metal musical groups
Musical groups established in 2005
Musical quartets